Auguste Baumans (born 26 October 1902, date of death unknown) was a Belgian racing cyclist. He rode in the 1928 Tour de France.

References

1902 births
Year of death missing
Belgian male cyclists
Place of birth missing